Strictly Genteel is a compilation album by Frank Zappa. It focuses on Zappa's "classical" and "serious" compositions, and as such is something of a companion to the previous Rykodisc-produced compilation, Strictly Commercial, which focused on "rock" songs with vocals. It was released in 1997.

Track listing

Credits

Production
Jill Christiansen - Compilation producer
Toby Mountain - Mastering
Don Menn - Liner notes
Guido Harari - Cover photograph
Ferenc Dobronyi - Package design

References

1997 compilation albums
Classical crossover albums
Compilation albums published posthumously
Frank Zappa compilation albums
Rykodisc compilation albums